ROYGBIV is an acronym for the sequence of hues commonly described as making up a rainbow: red, orange, yellow, green, blue, indigo, and violet. There are several mnemonics that can be used for remembering this color sequence, such as the name "Roy G. Biv" or sentences such as "Richard of York Gave Battle in Vain".

History

In the Renaissance, several artists tried to establish a sequence of up to seven primary colors from which all other colors could be mixed. In line with this artistic tradition, Sir Isaac Newton divided his color circle, which he constructed to explain additive color mixing, into seven colors. Originally he used only five colors, but later he added orange and indigo to match the number of musical notes in the major scale.

The Munsell color system, the first formal color notation system (1905), names only five "principal hues": red, yellow, green, blue, and purple.

Mnemonics
Isaac Newton's color sequence (red, orange, yellow, green, blue, indigo, violet) is kept alive today by several popular mnemonics. One is simply the nonsense word roygbiv, which is an acronym for the seven colors. This word can also be envisioned as a person's name, "Roy G. Biv".

Another traditional mnemonic device has been to turn the initial letters of the seven spectral colors into a sentence, most commonly "Richard Of York Gave Battle In Vain" (or the slight alternative "Richard Of York Gained Battles In Vain"). This mnemonic is said to refer to the defeat and death of Richard, Duke of York at the Battle of Wakefield in 1460, or to his son Richard III being defeated at the battle of Bosworth Field in 1485. Another sentence sometimes used is "Read Out Your Good Book In Verse", referring to the Bible.

The color sequence may also be recalled in reverse order with the mnemonic vibgyor.

In the modern era, these traditional mnemonics have been adapted to reflect the use of the rainbow flag as a symbol of LGBT movements. In Ireland, a campaign to reduce homophobic prejudice among schoolchildren revolves around the phrase "Respect Others, You Grow By Including Variety".

References

Optical spectrum
Mnemonics